LÉ James Joyce (P62) is a  (OPV) which was built by Babcock Marine Appledore for the Irish Naval Service. Although criticised by a descendant of the author, the ship was named for writer James Joyce.

Design and construction

In October 2010, the Irish Naval Service ordered a number of new offshore patrol vessels from Babcock Marine, a UK-based shipbuilder operating out of Appledore, North Devon. Like the similar Róisín-class OPV, James Joyce was designed by Vard Marine.

In July 2013, the name of the vessel, James Joyce was announced by the Minister for Defence Alan Shatter in Dáil Éireann.

Operational history
The ship was completed and floated out of the shipyard in November 2014. Following sea-trials and a number of delays it was delivered to the Naval Service in mid-2015. The official naming and commissioning ceremony was held at Dún Laoghaire on 1 September 2015. In November 2016, personnel from the LÉ James Joyce boarded the  FV Margiris as part of a fisheries inspection.

References

Ships built in Devon
Samuel Beckett-class offshore patrol vessels
2014 ships